The Anguille Mountains are a section of the Long Range Mountains located on the west coast of the island of Newfoundland, Canada, along the Gulf of St. Lawrence.

Covering the first  area from Cape Anguille along Bay St. George, the mountains are considered part of the Long Range Mountains which in turn are considered to be a section of the Appalachian Mountain system.

References 

Mountain ranges of Newfoundland and Labrador